Fragments of Unbecoming is a melodic death metal band from Laudenbach, Germany. The band's guitarist Sascha Ehrich is also a renowned artist in the metal world, having designed album covers for bands such as Necrophagist. The band's name was taken from the lyrics for the Edge of Sanity song "Darkday".

Band members

Current line up
 Sam Anetzberger − vocals (2004−present)
 Stefan Weimar − rhythm guitar, backing vocals (2000−present)
 Sascha Ehrich − lead guitar, acoustic guitar (2000−present)
 Ingo Maier − drums (2000−present)
 Christopher Körtgen - bass guitar (2009−present)

Former members
 Wolfram Schellenberg − bass guitar (2000−2009)

Guest appearances 
 Todd Douglas Collins (Lord Gloom of Afterlight) − Infinite Scream on "A Faint Illumination"

Discography 
 Bloodred Tales – Chapter I – The Crimson Season (EP, Sylphony Creations, 2002)
 Skywards – A Sylphe's Ascension (full-length, [Metal Blade, 2004)
 Sterling Black Icon – Chapter III – Black but Shining (full-length, Metal Blade, 2006)
 Everhaunting Past Chapter IV - A Splendid Retrospection (full-length, Cyclone Empire, 2009)
 The Art of Coming Apart (full-length, 2012)
 Perdition Portal - Chapter VI  (full-length, 2018)

References

External links 
 
 

Musical groups established in 2000
German melodic death metal musical groups
Musical quintets